SS Empire Bunting was a  cargo ship which was built in 1919. She saw service between the wars under the US flag and was transferred to the UK Ministry of War Transport in the Second World War. She made a number of cross-Atlantic voyages, often sailing in convoys. She ended her career by being sunk as a blockship on the Normandy coast, supporting the allied landings there in 1944.

Description
Empire Bunting was built as Eelbeck by the shipbuilding firm of Skinner & Eddy Corporation, Seattle, Washington, and launched on 28 June 1919 and completed in August 1919 for service with United States Shipping Board (USSB). The engine was built by Hooven, Owens & Rentschler, Hamilton, Ohio.

Career
Eelbeck'''s port of registry was Seattle. She sailed for the USSB until the board's abolition, and by 1937 was sailing for its successor organisation, the United States Maritime Commission. Eelbeck continued to sail under the American flag after the outbreak of the Second World War, during the period of American neutrality. In 1941, with the American entry to the war, Eelbeck was transferred to the ownership of the Ministry of War Transport, which assigned her to be operated by the firm of Headlam & Sons, under the name of Empire Bunting. Her port of registry was changed to London.Empire Bunting went on to sail in a considerable number of convoys across the North Atlantic, often carrying scrap steel or general cargo to Britain from Canada or the United States.

SC 38
Convoy SC 38 departed Sydney, Nova Scotia on 22 July 1941 and arrived at Liverpool on 8 August. Empire Bunting was carrying a cargo of scrap steel. She was forced to return to St John's after she collided with the Greek merchant ship Dimitrios Chandris.

SC 121
Convoy SC 121 departed New York on 23 February 1943 and arrived at Liverpool on 14 March. Empire Bunting was one of three ships which joined the convoy from St. John's, Newfoundland. She was carrying a general cargo bound for the Clyde. On 11 March, her steering failed and she arrived at Liverpool under tow.

HX 254
Convoy HX 254 departed New York on 27 August 1943 and arrived at Liverpool on 12 September. Empire Bunting was carrying a general cargo bound for Glasgow. She put into St John's with an engine defect which was causing her to produce heavy smoke and run at reduced speed.

In early 1944 she was reassigned to be operated by J&J Denholm Ltd, but in February she was bought by the Admiralty. She made her last wartime voyage as part of one of the Corn cob convoys, sailing from Poole to the Seine Bay in early June 1944. She was scuttled at Juno Beach on 9 June 1944, forming one of the corn cobs designed to shelter the landing beaches for the invasion forces.Empire Bunting was salvaged in 1947, towed to Strangford Lough and broken up there.

Official Numbers, code letters and call signs
Official Numbers were a forerunner to IMO Numbers. Eelbeck had the US Official Number 218667. Empire Bunting had the UK Official Number 168163.Eelbeck used the code letters LSGC until 1934, when they were replaced with the Call sign KINQ. Empire Bunting '' used the call sign GMKM.

Notes

References

 (Enter search term 'Empire Bunting')

1919 ships
Design 1105 ships of the Ministry of War Transport
Empire ships
Maritime incidents in June 1944
Merchant ships of the United States
Scuttled vessels of the United Kingdom
Ships built by Skinner & Eddy
Steamships of the United Kingdom
Steamships of the United States
Ships sunk as breakwaters